The Saint Catherine of Alexandria Cathedral Parish, better known as Dumaguete Cathedral, is a Roman Catholic church and cathedral in Dumaguete, Negros Oriental, Philippines. The cathedral is the seat of the Roman Catholic Diocese of Dumaguete and is considered as the island's oldest stone church having been completed in 1776.

History
When the parish of Dumaguete (then a pueblo) was founded in 1620, its jurisdiction covered Negros's southeastern part and the island of Siquijor. Eight secular priests initially served in the parish until 1645, with the first being Fr. Juan de Roa y Herrera. When Fr. Jose Fernandez de Septien served as the Dumaguete's parish priest, the stone church was constructed from 1754 to 1776. Also, it was under Fr. Septien's leadership when the four watchtowers at each corner of the church's lot were constructed which primarily aimed to drive away the Moros ransacking the community from the south. 

 After Fr. Septien's tenure as a parish priest in 1776, 18 more had served in Dumaguete until the arrival of the first Recollect friar to serve in the town in 1855. Between the said years, additional constructions include the church's transept, and the annex that connected the church itself to the old convent. A firecracker-caused blaze during the town fiesta of 1846 charred the entire church's wooden ceiling, altars, some of the pews, religious articles and the church organ. The said fire spared the connected convent after the people hurdled to put the fire out immediately. Fr. Antonio Moreno added sacred vestments and articles when he was the parish priest from 1859 to 1866. It was also during Fr. Moreno's time when the church was furnished with galvanized roofing in consonance with the construction of the local children's school made with stone. The full renovation of the church's flooring with fine wood and the addition of a bell tower on one of the watchtowers came under the helm of Fr. Juan Felix de Encarnacion from 1867 to 1879. In 1885, when Fr. Mariano Bernad is the parish priest, the portico was finished, and the following year, two side altars were dedicated to the Virgen de Consolacion and Saint Joseph. The whole church interior was also fully-painted and adorned with embellishments and an organ from Zaragoza was acquired in 1891.

In 1898, the Recollects left when the revolution broke out prior to the war, leaving the seculars again in-charge of the parish. The Recollects returned in 1909 and one of the watchtowers was installed again with a belfry. The church of Dumaguete became a cathedral when its eponymous diocese was founded in 1955. At present, the cathedral and the lone surviving watchtower-belfry at its southeastern side, are two of the most known landmarks of Dumaguete and Negros Oriental.

Gallery

References

External links
 Facebook page 

Buildings and structures in Dumaguete
Spanish Colonial architecture in the Philippines
Roman Catholic cathedrals in the Philippines
18th-century Roman Catholic church buildings in the Philippines
19th-century Roman Catholic church buildings in the Philippines
20th-century Roman Catholic church buildings in the Philippines
1620 establishments in the Spanish Empire
1776 establishments in the Spanish Empire
Baroque architecture in the Philippines
Dumaguete